Running Man is a South Korean variety show, formerly part of SBS' Good Sunday lineup. It first aired on July 11, 2010.

Running Man was originally classified as an "urban action variety"; a genre of variety shows in an urban environment. The MCs and guests were to complete missions at a landmark to win the race. The show has since shifted to a more familiar reality-variety show concept focused on games. It has garnered attention as being the comeback program for Yoo Jae-suk, the main MC of the program, after leaving Good Sundays Family Outing in February 2010.

The show has become popular in other parts of Asia, and has gained online popularity among Hallyu fans, having been fansubbed into various languages, such as English, Persian, Spanish, Portuguese, French, Italian, Thai, Vietnamese, Chinese, Malay, Indonesian, Burmese, Arabic, Russian, and Turkish. The show has made it to the list of Business Insiders 20 TV Shows of 2016.

Since April 2017, Running Man is airing as the first part of Good Sunday at 4:50 pm KST and competing against KBS2's The Return of Superman and MBC's King of Mask Singer. Running Man previously aired at 6:25 pm KST on Sundays, as the second part of Good Sunday, competing against KBS2's 2 Days & 1 Night. The show celebrated its 11th anniversary on July 11, 2021, with 563 episodes, surpassing MBC's Infinite Challenge for the longest entertainment program in South Korea.

Format

Current 
As of episode 48, the members have taken part in a series of missions to become the winner(s) at the end of the race. Missions form the basis of Running Man as members try to avoid punishment in earlier episodes or to win prizes. Multiple missions are presented in each episode, with the highlight of Running Man being race missions. The format of the show has veered away from the "race mission + others" to "one continuous race + missions".

Previous

Personnel

Cast members

Current
 Yoo Jae-suk (Episode 1–present)
 Haha (Episode 1–present)
 Jee Seok-jin (Episode 1–present)
 Kim Jong-kook (Episode 1–present)
 Song Ji-hyo (Episode 6–present)
 Jeon So-min (Episode 346–present)
 Yang Se-chan (Episode 346–present)

Former
 Lizzy (Episode 18–25)
 Song Joong-ki (Episode 1–41)
 Gary (Episode 1–324)
 Lee Kwang-soo (Episode 1–559)

Timeline
The original cast members consists of Yoo Jae-suk, Gary, Haha, Jee Seok-jin, Kim Jong-kook, Lee Kwang-soo and Song Joong-ki. Song Ji-hyo was originally a guest for the second (episode 2–3) and third landmark (episode 4–5). She officially joined the program in the fourth landmark (episode 6) but was unable to attend until the fifth landmark (episode 7).  In April 2011, Song Joong-ki recorded his last episode (episode 41) in May, and has left the program to focus on his acting career but returned on episode 66 as a guest after leaving for almost half a year, and later made cameo appearances in several episodes. After School's Lizzy was initially a guest for episode 13 and 14, and would later join in episode 18 as official member. However, she left show from episode 26 due to schedule conflicts with her group activities. She later returned as a guest in episode 292, 5 years since her last appearance. On October 25, 2016, Gary announced his departure from the show to focus on his music career after being with Running Man for 6 years, but later returned as a guest, a week after his final recording. On April 3, 2017, it was confirmed through various media outlets that Running Man is adding actress Jeon So-min and comedian Yang Se-chan. On April 27, 2021, Lee Kwang-soo announced his departure, becoming the third original cast member to leave the show.

Production staff 
The staff run the games, often showing up on camera either by actively participating in the game or influencing the outcome of various missions. This includes the personal cameramen (VJs), production directors (PDs), floor directors (FDs), stylists, boom operators, etc.

Chief producer, Nam Seung-yong, is responsible for the production of the program, with PD Jo Hyo-jin, Im Hyung-taek, and Kim Joo-hyung (also known as Myeok PD) mainly responsible for the directing and production of the recordings of the program since inception. Other PDs have joined the program to assist as the program shifts from a single landmark to multiple locations for recording, notably Hwang Seon-man, Jeong Cheol-min, and Lee Hwan-jin. FD Go Dong-wan assists in the recordings of the program and is known to be shown on camera many times, as well as delivering and assisting the members in missions. Producer Kim Joo-hyung has left the show as of episode 182 as he was reassigned to Inkigayo.

Each member has their own personal cameramen who follow them around exclusively during recordings. Notable cameramen include Ryu Kwon-ryeol (Yoo Jae-suk's primary VJ), Kim Yoo-seok (Jee Seok-jin's primary VJ), Choi Yoon-sang (former primary VJ for Lee Kwang-soo), Yoon Sung-yong (Haha's primary VJ), Sung Gyu (Song Ji-hyo's primary VJ), Jo Seong-Oh (Gary's primary VJ, now Yang Se-chan's primary VJ), Kim Ki-jin (Kim Jong-kook's primary VJ), and Ji Bong-jo (Jeon So-min's primary VJ).

On November 19, 2014, the show's head director, Jo Hyo-jin, announced his departure from the show after working with the members for four years. On March 20, 2016, the show's main PD, Im Hyung-taek left the show (as of episode 291) as he became the producer of Hurry Up, Brother, resulting in new generation PDs to take over, notably PD Lee Hwan-jin, PD Jeong Cheol-min, and PD Park Yong-woo. FD Go Dong-wan also announced his leave via his Instagram.

On July 3, 2016, SBS confirmed the return of producer Kim Joo-hyung to the show. That same month, it is confirmed that he will be the new main PD of the show. However, it didn't last long as PD Kim Joo-hyung announced that he is leaving the show shortly after. Subsequently, PD Lee Hwan-jin took over as the main PD of Running Man until March 2017. In April 2017, PD Jeong Cheol-min took over from PD Lee Hwan-Jin as the Running Man main PD.

In July 2018, PD Jeong Cheol-min took a break and PD Lee Hwan-jin temporarily took over as main PD of the show. PD Jeong returned in May 2019 replacing PD Lee, leading the show till February 5, 2020, where he left the show and SBS. His role was taken over by PD Choi Bo-pil.

On August 1, 2022, SBS announced that PD Choi Bo-pil would be leaving the show, with PD Choi Hyung-in taking over the role, making her the first female production director in the show's history.

Guests with the most appearances 
During its run, some of the guests were occasionally featured or invited to the show. The following list are guests who appeared the most often as of March 12, 2023.

Episodes

Guests 

Many guests have taken part in Running Man. The following is a compilation of guests and the number of times they have been on the show.
With regards to guest-turned-members (Song Ji-hyo, Jeon So-min, Yang Se-chan) or former members of the show (Lizzy, Song Joong-ki, Gary, Lee Kwang-soo), only the times they were a guest are counted. The guests were sorted according to their appearances and the number of episodes appeared.

Reception 

The first episode of the show received mixed reviews. According to Asiae, the show concept was promising, but the crew could not use the location to full potential, and the pace was not fast and dynamic enough. 

Despite a slow start, Running Man became increasingly popular in South Korea and throughout Asia. In its home country the show is watched by 2.1 million people on average. Due to the existence of fansubs, it is watched outside of Asia as well, being translated into English, Spanish and Arabic, among others.

According to The Straits Times (an English language daily newspaper in Singapore), the popularity of the show is due to its unpredictability, the comedy involved, the celebrity guests and the chemistry between the regular cast members. Assistant professor Liew Kai Khiun at the Nanyang Technological University (Singapore) attributes the appeal of Running Man to the ability of using public space in a creative way: "Running Man is about taking audiences to the various corners of not only South Korea, but the region as well. In the rather fast-paced urban societies in Asia, the show helps to provide release from the daily tensions that such streets and buildings are associated with." Liew thinks that the cast members are not particularly good looking, thus have nothing to lose, even if they "wrestle with one another like children".

According to producer Jo Hyo-jin, the show is popular because the concept of having to choose a winner is culturally easy to understand. He also named the good relationship between the regular members as one of the reasons for the show's success. Celebrity guests like Super Junior, Girls' Generation and f(x) play an important part in the success as well, although they sometimes induce criticism. For example, after the airing of the Big Bang episodes, some viewers complained that the band won too easily. Jo Hyo-jin, however, denied any special treatment of the celebrities. Jo explained that fans are also highly critical of the games, therefore it is not possible for the crew to reuse games without changing them.

The regular members of Running Man have held several fan meetings throughout Asia. In October 2013, their Singapore fan meeting drew a crowd of 3,000. When the cast arrived for shooting in Vietnam and other countries, they were greeted by thousands of fans at the airport.

Discography 
In conjunction with the 9th year of show, the show held their first ever fan-meeting in South Korea. During the fan-meeting, they collaborate with the different singers. On September 22, 2019, the extended play titled Running Man Fan Meeting: Project Running 9 was released.

Ratings

Tours

Other works

Merchandising 

In order to "relay the feeling of Running Man", Running Man has made merchandises available on sale since 2015. The products ranging from stickers, socks, hats, shirts, and shoes.

On May 26, 2015, a special project called the "Running Man Challenge" was made in collaboration with a footwear co-created platform, ROOY. Its main objective is for the fans to design a shoe that "would unify and coordinate between the cast members." 777 submissions were made, and in June 2015, a design made by a fan named Noh Seung-soo was selected to be the official design for the shoes. The shoes went on sale on February 22, 2016. Currently, a second "Running Man Challenge" is held. The winner for this challenge will have their design to be the new shoes.

In 2016, Running Man collaborated with NBA to make a 300th Anniversary special hats and shirts.

Animation 

On June 14, 2017, it was announced that Running Man will be adapted into a half-hour animated show. It features the original seven members, including former member Gary, in animal form. The show will have 24 episodes and EXO-CBX will provide the theme song for it. Additionally, the animated show will be the first to be broadcast in UHD in South Korea. On August 11, 2018, the animated show premiered on Cartoon Network in Southeast Asia as an English dub.

On December 5, 2018, the "Running Man, 2018" animated series was released in theaters. On December 19, 2020, an animated movie, originally serving as a six-episode preview of the new season, premiered on Cartoon Network in Southeast Asia as an English dub with the title "Running Man: The Ultimate Challenge".

Comic book 
In March 2013, a comic book adaptation of the series was published. The series, titled Running Man: How do I Find the Kidnapped Idol?, is written by Hong Yong-hoon and illustrated by Kim Moon-shik. The comic book, which is aimed for children, was released on March 25, 2013.

Musical 
On March 30 and 31, 2019, a play which was titled, "The Musical Running Man" was performed at Busan Citizen's Hall.

Other appearances

International versions 
Running Man had first sold the franchise to China which became Running Man China in 2014. They later sold the franchise to Vietnam and Indonesia in 2019.

As of June 6, 2019, there have been aired 9 seasons within 3 franchises of Running Man.
 Currently airing (2)
 An upcoming season (2)
 Status unknown (0)
 No longer airing (0)

Spin-off
Outrun by Running Man is the first official spin-off series of the long running programmme, featuring original cast members Haha, Jee Seok-jin and Kim Jong-kook. The show premiered on November 12, 2021, and is available for streaming on Disney+ platform.

Controversy

Gary's departure 
In September 2012, Gary made a surprising announcement on social media about his intention to leave the program. It is believed that his intention came from the recent criticism concerning the "Super 7 Concert" which his company, Leessang Company, was producing. Gary decided to take responsibility for its failure by resigning himself from any activities. Due to this, Running Man production staff and the members decided to postpone their filming schedule on September 24–25, 2012 to convince him to stay in the program. A week later, Gary officially apologized for the controversy he created and confirmed his decision to remain as a member of the program. In 2016, Gary again announced his departure from Running Man to focus on his music. This caused Running Man to have a 6-member cast for a few months before casting two new members, Yang Se Chan and Jeon So Min. Gary returned on episode 336 as a surprise guest.

Season 2 proposal 
On December 14, 2016, it was announced that Kim Jong-kook and Song Ji-hyo were leaving the show, as a new season with a new format starring the remaining cast members and new member Kang Ho-dong would air in January 2017. Initial reception was mixed. However, it was revealed that Kim Jong-kook and Song Ji-hyo were not given any notice about their removal, resulting in an overwhelming negative reaction. In addition, news of Kang refusing the offer to join the new season resulted in a possible cancellation of Season 2 of Running Man.

On December 16, 2016, an emergency meeting was held with the consensus reached that all members would leave, ending the program altogether in February 2017 with a subsequent program taking its place.

However, on January 24, 2017, SBS announced that the show will continue airing with all of the remaining cast members. The decision came after Nam Seung-yong, the new Vice President of SBS Entertainment Headquarters, who was involved in conceiving Running Man, had further conversations with every member in regards to the show's future. Subsequently, after apologizing to Kim Jong-kook and Song Ji-hyo for all of the issues regarding the program, the former then became actively involved in convincing the other members to continue working on the program.

Webtoon plagiarism 
On April 28, 2019, Running Man was criticized for plagiarizing Naver webtoon “Money Game”. The aired episode showed cast members put into a studio and given money to spend as a group. The fans of the "Money Game" webtoon pointed out the similarities between the episode concept and the webtoon's storyline. “Money Game” writer Bae Jin-Soo and Naver Webtoon, the platform in which the webtoon is published, both stated that they never received prior notification or requests for consent to be able to adopt the "Money Game" storyline into a Running Man episode. In response, producers of Running Man issued an apology to both parties.

Depiction of Taiwan 
During an episode aired on December 7, 2020, the show depicted China and Taiwan as separate countries when playing a board game, which caused outrage and call for boycotts in China.

Awards and nominations

References

External links 

  
 

 
Seoul Broadcasting System original programming
South Korean variety television shows
South Korean game shows
2010 South Korean television series debuts
Korean-language television shows
Television game shows with incorrect disambiguation